.bj is the Internet country code top-level domain (ccTLD) for Benin. It is administered by the Office of Stations and Telecommunications of Benin. Despite having no "j" in its name in any of its official languages, Benin was allocated .bj as the other possible codes .be, .bn, and .bi had already been allocated to other entities.

Structure 
Registrations are possible at second level as well as a number of third level domains.

Alphanumeric terms made up of letters of the French alphabet from A to Z, digits from 0 to 9, and hyphens are allowed in domain names. Domain names that are composed of a single character, are composed of two letters only, or begin or end with a hyphen cannot be registered.

See also 

 Telecommunications in Benin
 Republic of Dahomey

References

External links 
 IANA .bj whois information

Communications in Benin
Country code top-level domains

sv:Toppdomän#B